Claude Bakadal (born 19 March 1976) is a French former professional footballer who played as a forward.

Playing career
Bakadal started his senior career with FC Massy 91. He went on to play for Linas-Montlhéry, Évry, Grenoble, and Mouscron. In 2003, he signed for Diyarbakırspor in the Turkish Süper Lig, where he made twenty-seven appearances and scored six goals. After that, he played for Turkish club Akçaabat Sebatspor and French clubs Sainte-Geneviève and FC Issy before retiring.

Coaching career 
From 2013 to 2014, Bakadal was an assistant coach at Viry-Châtillon.

Personal life 
Born in France, Bakadal is of Cameroonian descent.

References

External links 
 at Footballdatabase.eu
 at Soccerway 
 Foot National Profile

1976 births
Living people
French footballers
French sportspeople of Cameroonian descent
Association football forwards
ESA Linas-Montlhéry players
Évry FC players
Grenoble Foot 38 players
R.E. Mouscron players
Diyarbakırspor footballers
Akçaabat Sebatspor footballers
Sainte-Geneviève Sports players
French expatriate footballers
Expatriate footballers in Turkey
French expatriate sportspeople in Turkey
French football managers
Association football coaches
ES Viry-Châtillon non-playing staff